Lake Benmore is New Zealand's largest artificial lake. Located in the South Island of New Zealand and part of the Waitaki River, it was created in the 1960s by construction of Benmore Dam.

Characteristics 
The lake has an area of about 75 km² and a maximum depth of 90 meters. The lake consists of two arms: the Haldon arm, fed mainly by the Tekapo, Pukaki and Twizel rivers, and the Ohau Canal; and the Ahuriri Arm, fed mainly by the Ahuriri River. Immediately downstream is Lake Aviemore.

As of 2020, Land Air Water Aotearoa described the water quality as "good" and the quality of ecological conditions as "high".

The lake is split between the Mackenzie, Waimate, and Waitaki districts, within the southern portion of the Canterbury Region.

Construction 
The lake is the reservoir of Benmore Dam, New Zealand's largest earth dam, which was created as part of the Waitaki hydroelectricity power scheme. Construction of Benmore Dam was approved in 1957 and the lake was filled in December 1964.

After the lake was created the incidence of seismic shocks increased by a factor of three to six times.

Uses 
Besides being a reservoir for Benmore Dam, the lake is a fishing spot; in 2009 it was the second most-fished lake in New Zealand, with fish such as brown trout, rainbow trout, chinook salmon, and sockeye salmon. Fish in the lake include salmon that have escaped from salmon farms on nearby hydro canals. The lake is also used for swimming and camping and there are walks in the area.

See also
Electricity sector in New Zealand
Lakes of New Zealand
List of lakes in New Zealand

References

External links

 Map of Waitaki District showing Lake Benmore bordering the Mackenzie and Waimate Districts

Lakes of Canterbury, New Zealand
Reservoirs in New Zealand